40 Bank Street is a skyscraper in Heron Quays, Docklands, London. The building was designed by Cesar Pelli & Associates and it was built by Canary Wharf Contractors.

See also
Tall buildings in London

References

External links
From emporis.com

Skyscrapers in the London Borough of Tower Hamlets
Buildings and structures in the London Borough of Tower Hamlets
Office buildings completed in 2003
Canary Wharf buildings